The 1984 Pacific typhoon season has no official bounds, but most tropical cyclones tend to form in the northwestern Pacific Ocean between May and November. These dates conventionally delimit the period of each year when most tropical cyclones form in the northwestern Pacific Ocean. Tropical Storms formed in the entire west pacific basin were assigned a name by the Joint Typhoon Warning Center. Tropical depressions that enter or form in the Philippine area of responsibility are assigned a name by the Philippine Atmospheric, Geophysical and Astronomical Services Administration or PAGASA. This can often result in the same storm having two names.

A total of 30 tropical depressions formed in 1984 in the Western Pacific, of which 27 became tropical storms, 16 reached typhoon intensity, and two reached super typhoon strength. Eight tropical cyclones moved into mainland China, four struck Vietnam, four moved through the Philippines, and one cyclone moved into South Korea. The second consecutive typhoon season with a late start, all of the season activity was contained between June and December, with August and October the most active months, contributing to half of the seasonal tropical cyclone count.

Season summary 

Despite its late start, a total of 30 tropical depressions formed this year in the Western Pacific, of which 27 became tropical storms. A total of 16 storms reached typhoon intensity, of which 2 reached super typhoon strength. Three of the systems formed in June, four in July, seven in August, four in September, eight in October, three in November, and one in December. Eight tropical cyclones moved into mainland China, four struck Vietnam, four moved through the Philippines, and one cyclone moved into South Korea. The most damaging and deadly typhoon this season was Ike, which led to significant damage and two-thirds of the overall seasonal death toll, mainly from the Philippines. The longest lived cyclone was Bill, which persisted for two weeks during mid November. Despite the eight tropical cyclones moving into China, Hong Kong received only 18 percent of its annual rainfall from tropical cyclones, which was 35 percent below the annual average.

Systems

Tropical Storm Vernon 

Tropical Storm Vernon, the first of the year, developed in the South China Sea on June 6. It moved northwest, and then westward in an environment of strong vertical wind shear, Vernon moved inland into Vietnam on June 10. Flooding of rice, sweet potato, and sesame crops in Quảng Nam-Da Nang province was caused by Vernon. Combined with 1983's late formation of Tropical Storm Sarah in June, this is only known time that two consecutive years had their first storm develop as late as June.

Severe Tropical Storm Wynne (Asiang) 

The monsoon trough established itself across the South China Sea eastward into the Philippine Sea on June 14. A tropical disturbance formed within this trough on June 16 in the northern Philippine Sea. Moving westward for much of its existence to the south of a narrow subtropical ridge, an upper level high developed over the strengthening low level circulation early on June 19, which became a tropical depression that day. By that evening, the cyclone had strengthened into a tropical storm. Strong upper level ridging over mainland China led to easterly vertical wind shear, which limited intensification. The cyclone passed by the southern coast of Taiwan, which caused slight weakening as it entered the South China Sea. Southwest flow to the south of Wynne led to flooding in Luzon, where  of riceland was destroyed. Three fisherman drowned north of Luzon. Late on June 25, Wynne made landfall in China near the Luichow Peninsula, and then weakened rapidly inland.

Typhoon Alex (Biring) 

On June 28, a surface circulation formed in the Philippine Sea. Development of the system began in earnest on June 30, and a tropical depression had formed early on July 1, with tropical storm status attained later in the day. A ridge to its north eroded, allowing Alex to move north-northwest towards Taiwan. Alex became the first typhoon of the season shortly before moving across the mountainous island. On July 5, extratropical transition of Alex had begun. By late in the day, it was an extratropical cyclone along a frontal zone in the Sea of Japan.

Severe Tropical Storm Betty (Konsing) 

Development of this system was slow within the eastern portion of the monsoon trough. The system moved northwest for much of its life cycle, initially following Alex and then the southwest side of the subtropical ridge. A broad tropical depression formed on the afternoon on July 5 within the disturbed weather area, weakening as it passed over Luzon. Late on July 7, ship reports indicated the system had become a tropical storm. The cyclone moved within the radar fence of Hong Kong near its peak intensity before making landfall  to its west-southwest during the early afternoon of July 9. Weakening over the topography of China was rapid thereafter, and the system dissipated by early on July 10.

Typhoon Cary 

Initiated by the tropical tropospheric trough (TUTT), an area of convection was first noted southeast of the upper trough in an area with favorable upper level divergence on July 2 near 18N 168E. The disturbance moved west-southwest and evolved into a tropical depression late on July 6 and a tropical storm soon after. Rapid development continued for another 12 hours as it slowly moved through the ridge axis. The cyclone turned northeast late on July 10 as it began to be sheared significantly from the northwest. As the typhoon progressed more poleward, increased vertical wind shear and the entrainment of cooler and drier air began its extratropical transition. By late on July 14, Cary had become an extratropical cyclone. The nontropical system then moved westward, eventually dissipating south of Japan.

Typhoon Dinah 

For two weeks after Betty and Cary, a high pressure dominated the northwest Pacific, with no sign of a monsoon trough. A cold front dropped into the area from the north, and remained stationary across much of the central North Pacific just north of Wake Island for nearly a week. An area of convection along the tail of the old frontal boundary formed on July 21, and closed off a wind circulation just northwest of Wake Island. Drifting westward, the system did not develop considerably until July 23. By late on July 24, it became a tropical depression.

Meanwhile, Tropical Storm Ed was approaching from the northwest and the ridge north of Dinah moved east, which turned the typhoon northwest. On July 27, while the cyclones were at their closest approach, Dinah weakened due to the more dominant outflow from Ed. The westerly shear led to a change in track to the east-northeast for Dinah. On July 28, once the cyclones moved farther apart, Dinah restrengthened rapidly and reached its maximum intensity by noon on July 29. Moving north-northeast around the western fringe of the subtropical ridge, Dinah's motion accelerated, moving close to Marcus Island late that afternoon, causing extensive vegetation damage. Weakening as it continued to move north-northeast, Dinah regained tropical storm status on July 31. Veering more northeast and interacting with a nearby upper trough in the Westerlies, Dinah became an extratropical cyclone late on August 1. The nontropical cyclone moved off the east, eventually crossing the International Date Line.

Typhoon Ed 

Ed formed along the tail of a weakening cold front just south of Japan on July 23. It took a day to become detached on satellite pictures, and become a tropical disturbance. On the morning of July 25 a surface circulation had formed and the cyclone became a tropical depression. By July 26, it became a tropical storm. Initially it moved southeast during this period of strengthening as it approached Typhoon Dinah. As a shortwave trough in the Westerlies approached Ed, the cyclone turned north and moved away from Dinah. Ridging built in quickly behind the shortwave, and the cyclone turned west-northwest; a course it would maintain until landfall in mainland China. Strengthening continued, and Ed became an intense typhoon just south of Kyūshū. As it moved across the East China Sea, cooler waters and drier air led to weakening. Turning northwest after landfall, Ed moved along the Chinese coast and gradually weakened. By late on August 1, it had dissipated as a tropical cyclone. The Korean ship Ishlin Glory sank in the Korea Strait on July 29, which led to one death and 11 others declared missing. The launch of the weather satellite GMS-3 was delayed by this typhoon's passage nearby Japan.

Severe Tropical Storm Freda (Ditang) 

The tail end of a trough extending southwest of Dinah west of Guam led to the development of this system. A tropical disturbance formed there on August 2 and developed a surface cyclone in the Philippine Sea later that day. A broad surface cyclone, the system tracked northwest and slowly developed. By late on August 5, it became a tropical depression. During the morning of August 6, it strengthened into a tropical storm while maintaining its broad center and a pair of circulation centers. The new northern center became dominant overnight. The system jumped northwest and quickly moved through the Formosa Straits before striking mainland China very early on August 8. Two died in Taiwan due to Freda. After two days inland, Freda finally dissipated as a tropical cyclone, but its cloud pattern remained identifiable for an additional day or two thereafter.

Tropical Depression 09W (Edeng) 

Moving northwest, the disturbance slowly organized as it moved into the southeast portion of the monsoon trough. On August 10, the low jogged northward for a day towards an upper-level low northwest of Taiwan. Late on August 11, the low became a tropical depression, which was named Edeng by PAGASA and designated 09W by the Joint Typhoon Warning Center. It then moved west-northwest along the northern side of the monsoon trough as a sheared system due to moderate southerly flow aloft. A new circulation center developed, which led to PAGASA renaming the system Gloring as it neared the southern coast of Taiwan. The depression ultimately merged with a low-pressure area over the South China Sea, which would develop into Tropical Storm Gerald.

Severe Tropical Storm Gerald (Huaning) 

Gerald formed within the monsoon trough in the northern South China Sea, where it meandered for its existence. The initial surface low formed on August 12 near 18N 117E. Slow development continued, and when the remains of Tropical Depression 09W/Gloring became absorbed by this cyclone, thunderstorm activity increased significantly. The storm's maximum sustained winds began to migrate closer to the center, and it became a tropical storm on the morning of August 16. Drifting west, Gerald slowly intensified for the next couple days. As Holly developed east of Taiwan, its outflow sheared Gerald, keeping the system from becoming a typhoon. Holly's proximity led to Gerald completing a small cyclonic loop on August 17. As Holly turned northwest, Gerald drifted westward once again. By August 20, Holly's large circulation over the East China Sea lured Gerald northeast. Shearing again increased, weakening Gerald. Once inland, it turned to the north and weakened rapidly.

Typhoon Holly (Isang) 

This system formed in the eastern end of the monsoon trough that spawned Gerald. A very large cyclone, it did not close off a wind circulation until it achieved tropical storm strength on the morning of August 16. Like Freda and TD 09W, it had a broad center with light winds for much of its life cycle. Kadena Air Force Base, on Okinawa, measured  of rainfall from this cyclone, and two periods of winds exceeding  on August 18, and then again late August 19 and early August 20. The cyclone moved westward under the base of the subtropical ridge and reached typhoon strength on the morning of August 18. The system turned northwest and then north around the ridge's periphery at a relatively slow speed. As the system turned northeast and accelerated out of the East China Sea into the Korea Strait, it led to considerable damage in the Korean peninsula and across Kyūshū. One perished, eleven were injured, and nine went missing. Miyazake, on Kyūshū, measured  of rainfall in a 24‑hour period during Holly's passage. This rainfall led to flooding and landslides. Interaction with nearby landmasses began to weaken Holly, and interaction with a mid-level trough led to its extratropical transition. Holly became an extratropical cyclone as it approached Hokkaidō early on August 23.

Tropical Depression 12W (Lusing) 

Convection formed in the eastern end of the monsoon trough just north of Guam on August 20, leading to the formation of a weak low-pressure area by late morning August 21. The system slowly consolidated as it moved northwest, and was separating from the monsoon trough on August 23. Although convection increased in organization, the surface wind field did not respond. Nevertheless, it was deemed a tropical depression on the morning of August 24. By the next morning, the surface circulation became exposed as upper-level conditions worsened due to strong southerlies aloft. The cyclone was no longer deemed tropical at that time. The surface cyclone moved northwest, crossing the Ryūkyū Islands before it merged with a frontal zone in the northern East China Sea late on August 26.

Typhoon Ike (Nitang) 

This tropical cyclone formed on August 27 in the Philippine Sea, and strengthened as it moved westward into the southern Philippines, becoming a typhoon on August 31. Typhoon Ike caused extreme wind and flooding damage when it crossed the Philippines, resulting in 1492 fatalities, one of the Philippines' worst natural disaster in modern times, and its worst typhoon since Amy struck the archipelago in 1951. A total of 200,000 to 480,000 were left homeless. Emerging from the Philippines as a strong tropical storm, Ike restrengthened as it tracked northwest through the South China Sea across northeast Hainan Island. Weakening back into a tropical storm, Ike moving inland into mainland China. Extensive crop damage was experienced in southern China, with Ike becoming the most significant tropical cyclone to strike Guangxi since 1954. Total damage was reportedly US$111 million (1984 dollars). The name Ike was retired after this season.

Typhoon June (Maring) 

A surface low formed within the monsoon trough on August 25. The low drifted westward as convection tried to consolidate around the center. Strong upper level wind shear inhibited development for the next couple of days. Moving westward, it struck Luzon early on August 29. By late morning, the system turned west-northwest over the mountainous island, emerging into the South China Sea. A total of 121 lives were taken by June across the Philippines, and damage totaled US$5 million (1984 dollars.) When Tropical Storm June hit southeast China on August 30, 67 people were reported dead due to extensive flooding from June's broad circulation.

Tropical Depression Moke 

JMA declared that a depression formed from a cold-core low on September 2. Moving eastwards, it crossed the International Date Line on the next day. Just after crossing it strengthened into a tropical storm, thus receiving the name Moke from the Central Pacific Hurricane Center.

Typhoon Kelly 

Developing at the southern end of a shear line, a low level circulation formed on September 13 with increasing convective organization to the south of a cold core cyclone. Completing a cyclonic loop, the cyclone continued to develop despite cool air becoming entrained within its circulation. Approaching the upper-level low, Kelly slowed down its northward motion and reached its maximum intensity. Soon afterwards, it rapidly accelerated northeast. Losing its tropical character late on September 17, it became an extratropical cyclone on the morning of September 18. This cyclone continued moving northeast for another few days, past the International Date Line and into the Gulf of Alaska.

Tropical Storm Lynn 

First noted as an area of poorly organized thunderstorms near Guam on September 19, the disturbance moved westward across the northern Philippine Sea. As an upper tropospheric cyclone weakened east of Luzon on September 22, upper-level conditions improved, but no reflection at the surface was yet witnessed. The thunderstorms entered the South China Sea on September 23 while a lee side surface low formed along the monsoon trough west of Luzon due to the strong easterly low-level flow. The disturbance rapidly consolidated, and it became a tropical depression early on September 24. Slowly intensifying as it moved west-northwest, Lynn became a tropical storm on September 25. At this point, the storm track became west-southwesterly and upper-level winds began to shear thunderstorms north of the center. The depression then turned northwest and dissipated near the Vietnam/Laos border early on September 28.

Severe Tropical Storm Maury 

The system formed near the intersection of the northeast end of the monsoon trough with a frontal boundary near Marcus Island just as Nina was developing 1300 km to its west on September 27. By early on September 28, it had become a tropical depression with tropical storm strength reached by noon as Maury moved north around Nina. Instead of recurving quickly around the subtropical ridge to its east and southeast, Maury slowed as it entered Nina's larger circulation. Nina absorbed Maury's circulation on October 1 as it overtook the storm from the southwest.

Tropical Storm Nina 

Like Maury, Nina formed near the intersection of a frontal zone and the monsoon trough. An upper level high north of Guam allowed for further development. Moving north, the system detached from the monsoon trough, and it became a tropical depression on September 28. Southerly shear across the system led to an initially subtropical appearance, as thunderstorms moved away from the center. This also prevented significant development. On September 29, the main belt of the Westerlies captured the cyclone, displacing thunderstorms even farther east of the center. With the low level circulation exposed, Nina weakened into a tropical depression. By late on September 30, the low level circulation moved back under the convection, which resulted in reintensification back to a tropical storm at the same time Maury was absorbed into its circulation. By late morning October 1, Nina reached its maximum intensity, but extratropical transition was already underway. Central convection decreased, and Nina became an extratropical cyclone by October 2.

Typhoon Ogden 

A weak surface low formed west of Truk on October 3, which contained little thunderstorm activity. Moving northwest, it joined the eastern section of the monsoon trough. Following the flow around the east side of the trough towards the north, poorly organized convection became associated with the persistent low. Once it neared the northeast fringe of the trough, convective organization improved. Although still a very broad system, it became a tropical depression on the morning of October 7. Moving around the southwest part of a retreating subtropical ridge, Ogden sharply recurved. By early October 8, it strengthened into a tropical storm and passed just east of Marcus Island. The cyclone attained typhoon intensity partially due to translational motion as it began to undergo extratropical transition on October 9. Southwest shear began to significantly impact the system thereafter, which weakened the system into a tropical storm on October 10. By noon, the system had fully evolved into an extratropical cyclone. The nontropical storm continued northeast towards the International Date Line.

Typhoon Phyllis 

Phyllis formed within a surface trough left behind by Ogden. By late on October 7, a surface low had formed east of Guam. The system drifted northeast. A compact system, the system became a tropical depression late on October 10 and a tropical storm on the morning of October 11. Northward acceleration had begun, and Phyllis became a typhoon the morning of October 12. A cut off low south of Honshū helped lead to strong southerly flow over Phyllis, which weakened the storm. The shear vector changed from southerly to easterly as the main belt of the Westerlies impacted the cyclone, which caused faster weakening. By the morning of October 14, Phyllis became a wave along the cold front approaching the system from the west.

Tropical Storm Roy 

Developing southwest of Guam as Phyllis was forming to its northeast, a weak circulation developed on October 9. Upper level wind shear from Ogden slowed development into October 10. Thereafter, convection became better organized with the system and it became a tropical depression by October 11. A compact system, it became a tropical storm later that morning. Strong upper level easterlies halted development due to vertical wind shear. The low-level monsoon flow became diverted from Roy to Phyllis, which removed a potential source of low-level vorticity. Roy was an exposed circulation center on October 12 with decreasing convection when its lowest central pressure was reached. By the morning of October 13, it lost its defined circulation center and had dissipated as a tropical cyclone.

Tropical Storm Susan 

On October 10, a circulation had formed in the central South China Sea. Slow to consolidate, the low accelerated west along the axis of the monsoon trough as it became a tropical depression late on October 11. Developing as it veered west-northwest, Susan became a minimal tropical storm as it made landfall just north of Nha Trang, Vietnam. The system turned northwest up the Mekong river valley, maintaining its identity as a convective area for the next three days. Extreme flooding struck eastern and central Vietnam on October 12 and caused 33 casualties and moderate crop damage.

Tropical Depression 23W 

Developing within the monsoon trough, convection increased near Truk on October 16. A central convective feature formed, and the system became a tropical depression that afternoon. Moving northwest, the depression weakened as it became sheared from the north and a larger circulation formed to its southeast, which evolved into Thad.

Typhoon Thad 

Developing southeast of Guam as Tropical Depression 23W was dissipating, this convective cluster moved north-northwest. Forming a circulation center near Truk, Thad became a tropical storm as it approached Guam on October 19. Moving east of the island, Thad became an intense typhoon very early on October 22. Recurving into the Westerlies thereafter, the cyclone slowly weakened as it accelerated northeast and became an extratropical cyclone by October 24.

Typhoon Vanessa (Toyang) 

This system formed in the near equatorial trough southeast of Ponape a few days after Thad on October 20. The system moved northwest to just north of Ponape as it slowly developed. The disturbance strengthened into a tropical depression by October 22 and a tropical storm October 23 despite some northwesterly shear from Thad. Damage on the island totaled US$1.7 million (1984 dollars), mainly to the banana crop. Moving west-northwest, Vanessa continued to strengthen, becoming a super typhoon. At its peak, it had a pressure of 880 mb, only 10 millibars higher than the record-setting Typhoon Tip of 1979. Its central pressure fell 100 mb in 48 hours. The intense cyclone recurved on October 27 and October 28 as a cold front approached from the northwest. Vanessa slowly merged with the frontal boundary, becoming a storm-force extratropical cyclone late on October 30.

Though the storm did not directly impact the Philippines, its outer bands triggered flooding that killed 63 people.

Severe Tropical Storm Warren (Reming) 

Embedded within the monsoon trough, it was a broad depression. It slowly weakened as it moved west-southwest through the Philippines into the South China Sea on October 22. Due to strengthening northeasterly low level flow, the circulation became better defined and conditions aloft favored strengthening. The system formed into a tropical depression late on October 23 despite easterly vertical wind shear. By early on October 24, Warren became a tropical storm which then turned to the north. Between October 24 and October 26, the cyclone performed a small cyclonic loop. On October 26, Warren strengthened into a typhoon.

The steering flow weakened around Warren at that time as Vanessa was moving to its northeast. Warren became entrained into Vanessa's southwestern circulation, and turned east-northeast. As Vanessa moved away from Warren, the cyclone performed an anticyclonic loop and turned back to the west on October 28. Clark Air Force Base recorded  of rainfall on October 28 and October 29 due to Warren. The heavy rains over the Philippines led to landslides which killed 42 people. The passenger ferry MV Venus capsized on October 28, which led to an additional 36 deaths. The 930-ton ship Lorenzo Container VIII sank that day, which led to eight missing crew members.

Another surge in the low-level northeast flow to Warren's north led to an expansion of its wind field. This cooler and drier air was also weakening the cyclone. On October 30, the storm turned west-southwest and continued weakening. By October 31 Warren had weakened to a tropical depression and it dissipated as a tropical cyclone over water. Its remaining convection moved into central Vietnam on November 1. Its weakening center led to gales along the coast. By November 2, Warren's circulation center dissipated.

Tropical Depression Seniang

Typhoon Agnes (Undang) 

This system began as an area of convection along the equator on October 28. Moving northwest, the system developed. On November 1, the system became a tropical depression and then strengthened into a tropical storm. The storm turned west-northwest due to a broad ridge to its north. Intensifying into a typhoon, Agnes became an intense typhoon as it approached the Philippines. Two months after Typhoon Ike hit the central Philippines,  Typhoon Agnes struck just south of Borongan on November 4. It crossed the islands and briefly weakened. Strengthening began as it moved through the South China Sea. It hit Quy Nhon, Vietnam as a  typhoon on November 7. Once onshore, Anges weakened rapidly before dissipating on November 8.

Across the Philippines, Agnes wrought catastrophic damage. A total of 201,014 homes were destroyed and another 163,506 were damaged, with losses amounting to 1.9 billion pesos (US$96.6 million). At least 895 people perished in the storm while 275 others were reported missing. Another 2,526 people were injured by the storm. Altogether, approximately 1.9 million people were affected by the typhoon. Extensive damage also took place in Vietnam where at least 134 people were killed. At least 30,000 homes were destroyed and another 120,000 were flooded or damaged.

Typhoon Bill (Welpring) 

An area of convection organized into a tropical depression on November 8 while east of Guam. It executed a small loop, reached tropical storm strength later on the 8th, and reached typhoon intensity on the 11th. Strong upper-level winds weakened the storm, and as a break in the subtropical ridge brought the storm northward, upper-level winds from Typhoon Clara weakened Bill to a tropical storm on the 18th. It looped southeastward while just east of Luzon, and looped again to the southwest on the 20th. Bill dissipated as a tropical cyclone on the November 22, after causing minor damage on its path.

Typhoon Clara (Yoning) 

A large, low-latitude disturbance formed in the eastern Caroline islands on November 11. By November 13, the surface low was gaining significant amounts of convection. Its circulation was aided by a tropical disturbance to its south in the Solomon islands which enhanced westerly flow between the two systems, increasing the low level vorticity within the northern hemisphere system. Consolidation of the system began, and the system became a tropical depression on November 14. Further development of this system into a tropical storm and typhoon was accompanied by an expansion in the size of its circulation. As Clara recurved east of 132E, it passed within  of Bill, which radically changed Bill's course and weakened both cyclones. Once Bill moved farther away, Clara reintensified into a strong typhoon by November 20. Recurvature of Clara continued, and it became an extratropical cyclone along an approaching frontal zone, and was able to be followed through November 22.

Typhoon Doyle (Aring) 

Its initial tropical disturbance was first noted near 5N 156E on December 1. The system moved west-northwest, slowly developing. A low-level circulation in the Coral Sea helped enhance westerly flow to its south, which developed into a tropical depression late on December 4 and a tropical storm early on December 5. Intensification continued, and typhoon strength was reached late on December 6. Turning more northwest, the typhoon became intense early on December 8. As it recurved northward, the cyclone weakened quickly late on December 9 and early on December 10. The cyclone became an exposed circulation, and dissipated as a tropical cyclone over water late on December 11.

Storm names 

During the season 27 named tropical cyclones developed in the Western Pacific and were named by the Joint Typhoon Warning Center, when it was determined that they had become tropical storms. These names were contributed to a revised list which started on 1979.

Philippines 

The Philippine Atmospheric, Geophysical and Astronomical Services Administration uses its own naming scheme for tropical cyclones in their area of responsibility. PAGASA assigns names to tropical depressions that form within their area of responsibility and any tropical cyclone that might move into their area of responsibility. Should the list of names for a given year prove to be insufficient, names are taken from an auxiliary list, the first 6 of which are published each year before the season starts. Names not retired from this list will be used again in the 1988 season. This is the same list used for the 1980 season. PAGASA uses its own naming scheme that starts in the Filipino alphabet, with names of Filipino female names ending with "ng" (A, B, K, D, etc.).

Retirement

International 

Due to a high death toll caused by Typhoon Ike, the name Ike was later retired and was replaced by Ian and was first used in the 1987 season.

Philippines 

PAGASA retired the names Nitang and Undang, and was replaced with Ningning and Unsang for the 1988 season. The name Aring was also decommissioned from the auxiliary list and replaced with Apiang, possibly because of a storm with the same name that caused destruction in Luzon in 1980

Season effects 
This is a table of all of the storms that have formed in the 1984 Pacific typhoon season. It includes their duration, names, affected areas, damages, and death totals. Deaths in parentheses are additional and indirect (an example of an indirect death would be a traffic accident), but were still related to that storm. Damage and deaths include totals while the storm was extratropical, a wave, or a low, and all of the damage figures are in 1984 USD. Names listed in parentheses were assigned by PAGASA.

|-
| Vernon ||  || bgcolor=#| || bgcolor=#| || bgcolor=#| || Vietnam||  None || None ||
|-
| Wynne (Asiang) ||  || bgcolor=#| || bgcolor=#| || bgcolor=#| || Philippines, Taiwan, South China|| None ||  ||
|-
| Alex (Biring) ||  || bgcolor=#| || bgcolor=#| || bgcolor=#| || Philippines, Taiwan, East China, South Korea || None || None ||
|-
| Betty (Konsing) ||  || bgcolor=#| || bgcolor=#| || bgcolor=#| || Philippines, South China|| None || None ||
|-
| Cary ||  || bgcolor=#| || bgcolor=#| || bgcolor=#| || Mariana Islands || None || None ||
|-
| Dinah ||  || bgcolor=#| || bgcolor=#| || bgcolor=#| || None ||  || None ||
|-
| Ed ||  || bgcolor=#| || bgcolor=#| || bgcolor=#| || Japan, Northeast China || None ||  ||
|-
| TD ||  || bgcolor=#| || bgcolor=#| || bgcolor=#| || Vietnam, South China || None || None ||
|-
| TD ||  || bgcolor=#| || bgcolor=#| || bgcolor=#| || South China || None || None ||
|-
| TD ||  || bgcolor=#| || bgcolor=#| || bgcolor=#| || None || None || None ||
|-
| Freda (Ditang) ||  || bgcolor=#| || bgcolor=#| || bgcolor=#| || Philippines, Taiwan, China, Ryukyu Islands || None ||  ||
|-
| 09W (Edeng) ||  || bgcolor=#| || bgcolor=#| || bgcolor=#| || Philippines, Taiwan || None || None ||
|-
| TD ||  || bgcolor=#| || bgcolor=#| || bgcolor=#| || None || None || None ||
|-
| Gloring ||  || bgcolor=#| || bgcolor=#| || bgcolor=#| || None || None || None ||
|-
| Gerald (Huaning) ||  || bgcolor=#| || bgcolor=#| || bgcolor=#| || South China || None ||  ||
|-
| Holly (Isang) ||  || bgcolor=#| || bgcolor=#| || bgcolor=#| || Japan, Korean Peninsula || None ||  ||
|-
| TD ||  || bgcolor=#| || bgcolor=#| || bgcolor=#| || Mariana Islands, Japan || None || None ||
|-
| 12W (Lusing) ||  || bgcolor=#| || bgcolor=#| || bgcolor=#| || None || None || None ||
|-
| Ike (Nitang) ||  || bgcolor=#| || bgcolor=#| || bgcolor=#| || Caroline Islands, Philippines, South China ||  ||  ||
|-
| June (Maring) ||  || bgcolor=#| || bgcolor=#| || bgcolor=#| || Philippines, Taiwan, China || None ||  ||
|-
| Moke ||  || bgcolor=#| || bgcolor=#| || bgcolor=#| || None || None || None ||
|-
| TD ||  || bgcolor=#| || bgcolor=#| || bgcolor=#| || None || None || None ||
|-
| Kelly ||  || bgcolor=#| || bgcolor=#| || bgcolor=#| || None || None || None ||
|-
| TD ||  || bgcolor=#| || bgcolor=#| || bgcolor=#| || Mariana Islands || None || None ||
|-
| Lynn ||  || bgcolor=#| || bgcolor=#| || bgcolor=#| || Vietnam ||  None || None ||
|-
| Osang ||  || bgcolor=#| || bgcolor=#| || bgcolor=#| || Caroline Islands || None || None ||
|-
| Maury ||  || bgcolor=#| || bgcolor=#| || bgcolor=#| || None || None || None ||
|-
| Nina ||  || bgcolor=#| || bgcolor=#| || bgcolor=#| || None ||  None || None ||
|-
| TD ||  || bgcolor=#| || bgcolor=#| || bgcolor=#| || None || None || None ||
|-
| TD ||  || bgcolor=#| || bgcolor=#| || bgcolor=#| || None|| None || None ||
|-
| Ogden ||  || bgcolor=#| || bgcolor=#| || bgcolor=#| || None || None || None ||
|-
| Phyllis ||  || bgcolor=#| || bgcolor=#| || bgcolor=#| || None || None || None ||
|-
| Roy ||  || bgcolor=#| || bgcolor=#| || bgcolor=#| || Mariana Islands ||  None || None ||
|-
| Susan ||  || bgcolor=#| || bgcolor=#| || bgcolor=#| || Vietnam ||  None ||  ||
|-
| 23W ||  || bgcolor=#| || bgcolor=#| || bgcolor=#| || Caroline Islands || None || None ||
|-
| Paring ||  || bgcolor=#| || bgcolor=#| || bgcolor=#| || Philippines || None || None ||
|-
| Thad ||  || bgcolor=#| || bgcolor=#| || bgcolor=#| || Caroline Islands, Mariana Islands || None || None ||
|-
| Vanessa (Toyang) ||  || bgcolor=#| || bgcolor=#| || bgcolor=#| || Caroline Islands, Mariana Islands, Philippines ||  ||  ||
|-
| Warren (Reming) ||  || bgcolor=#| || bgcolor=#| || bgcolor=#| || Philippines, Vietnam || None ||  ||
|-
| Seniang ||  || bgcolor=#| || bgcolor=#| || bgcolor=#| || Philippines, Taiwan || None || None ||
|-
| Agnes (Undang) ||  || bgcolor=#| || bgcolor=#| || bgcolor=#| || Caroline Islands, Philippines, Vietnam, Cambodia ||  ||  ||
|-
| Bill (Welpring) ||  || bgcolor=#| || bgcolor=#| || bgcolor=#| || Caroline Islands, Mariana Islands, Philippines || None || None ||
|-
| Clara (Yoning) ||  || bgcolor=#| || bgcolor=#| || bgcolor=#| || Caroline Islands || None || None ||
|-
| Doyle (Aring) ||  || bgcolor=#| || bgcolor=#| || bgcolor=#| || Caroline Islands || None || None ||
|-

See also 

 1984 Pacific hurricane season
 1984 Atlantic hurricane season
 1984 North Indian Ocean cyclone season
 Australian cyclone seasons: 1983–84, 1984–85
 South Pacific cyclone seasons: 1983–84, 1984–85
 South-West Indian Ocean cyclone seasons: 1983–84, 1984–85

References

External links 

 Japan Meteorological Agency
 Joint Typhoon Warning Center .
 National Weather Service Guam
 Hong Kong Observatory
 Macau Meteorological Geophysical Services
 Philippine Atmospheric, Geophysical and Astronomical Services Administration
 Taiwan Central Weather Bureau
 1984 Pacific typhoon season satellite movie

 
Articles which contain graphical timelines
1984 WPAC